Paramore's Videos. All of Them. Ever is a music video compilation album by American rock band Paramore. It was only released digitally via the iTunes Store on May 11, 2010. The album features ten of the band's most popular videos.

Music videos
  "The Only Exception" (directed by Brandon Chesbro)
  "Brick by Boring Brick" (directed by Meiert Avis)
  "Ignorance" (directed by Honey)
  "Decode" (directed by Shane Drake)
  "That's What You Get" (original version) (directed by Marcos Siega)
  "Crushcrushcrush" (directed by Shane Drake)
  "Misery Business" (directed by Shane Drake)
  "Emergency" (directed by Shane Drake)
  "Pressure" (directed by Shane Drake)
  "All We Know" (directed by Dan Dobi)

References

Paramore compilation albums
Paramore video albums
2010 compilation albums
2010 video albums
Music video compilation albums

Rock video albums